Farnborough North railway station is a railway station in the town of Farnborough in Hampshire, England. The station is managed by Great Western Railway, who operate services on the North Downs Line from Reading to Guildford, Redhill and Gatwick Airport.

It is one of two stations in Farnborough; the other, Farnborough (Main), is situated on the South West Main Line and is considerably busier.

History
The Reading, Guildford and Reigate Railway (RG&RR) was authorised in 1846 and opened in stages. One of the first two sections to open was between Reading and Farnborough, on 4 July 1849. Originally named Farnborough, the station was renamed Farnborough North on 9 July 1923.

On 17 April 1860, the bare-knuckle world championship between Tom Sayers, champion of England, and John C. Heenan, champion of the USA, took place in a field just East of the station. The fighters and vast crowd had arrived by train from London.

Station facilities
At the station, there is a self-service ticket machine, a very small car park and disabled access to the platform. There is, however, no staffed ticket office and no waiting room.

Services
Farnborough North is served by one train per hour in each direction Monday to Saturday, and every two hours on Sundays. There are additional trains during peak periods on weekdays. The majority of trains operate between Reading and Redhill, with a few trains each day continuing to Gatwick Airport.

References

External links

 Video footage of the station on YouTube

Railway stations in Hampshire
DfT Category F1 stations
Former South Eastern Railway (UK) stations
Railway stations in Great Britain opened in 1849
Railway stations served by Great Western Railway
Farnborough, Hampshire
1849 establishments in England